Transferoviar Călători (TFC), a subsidiary of Transferoviar Grup, is a private railway operator from Romania that has as its main activity the public passenger transportation that is assured on 7 non-interoperable lines as well as on interoperable (public administration) infrastructure. These routes are served with short to medium haul light rolling stock, diesel multiple units consisting of two or three carriages. Units can be coupled together to cope with rush hour services.

The company was founded on 24 February 2010, being located at first in Bucharest and since 25 June 2012, its social headquarters has been moved to the city of Cluj-Napoca, although operational HQs still remain in the capital city.

Routes 

 Mainline services (open access on CFR network)
 Bucharest North - Ploiești Sud - Buzău - Galați
 Bucharest North - Târgoviște
 Cluj Napoca - Oradea
 Regional & leased-line services
 Titan Sud - Oltenița
 Galați - Târgu Bujor - Bârlad
 Buzău - Nehoiașu
 Slănic - Ploiești Sud
 Ploiești Sud - Măneciu
 Ploiești Sud - Târgoviște
 Târgoviște - Pietroșița

Rolling stock

References

External links
 Transferoviar Călători

Railway companies of Romania
Passenger rail transport in Romania
Romanian companies established in 2010